Women's coxless pair competition at the 2008 Summer Olympics in Beijing was held between August 9 and 16 at the Shunyi Olympic Rowing-Canoeing Park.

This rowing event is a sweep rowing event, meaning that each boat rower has one oar and rows on only one side. The crew consists of two rowers, with no coxswain used. The competition consists of multiple rounds. Finals were held to determine the placing of each boat; these finals were given letters with those nearer to the beginning of the alphabet meaning a better ranking.

During the first round two heats were held. The top boats in each heat advanced directly to the A final, while all of the other boats were sent to the repechage. Two repechage heats were held, with the top two boats in each of the repechage heats going on to the A final. The remaining finishers in the repechages competed in the B final.

The A final determined the medals, along with other rankings through 6th place. The B final determined the remaining (7th through 10th) places.

Schedule
All times are China Standard Time (UTC+8)

Results

Heats
Qualification Rules: 1->FA, 2..->R

Heat 1

Heat 2

Repechages
Qualification Rules: 1-2->FA, 3..->FB

Repechage 1

Repechage 2

Final B

Final A

References

External links
NYT Olympic Report

Rowing at the 2008 Summer Olympics
Women's rowing at the 2008 Summer Olympics
Women's events at the 2008 Summer Olympics